Euclemensia barksdalensis is a moth in the family Cosmopterigidae. It was described by Lee and Brown in 2011. It is found in Louisiana.

The forewings are dark brown with a postbasal band of yellowish orange scales, extending to the base between two dark brown basal spots. The hindwings are dark brown.

Etymology
The species name is derived from the type locality at Barksdale Air Force Base.

References

Natural History Museum Lepidoptera generic names catalog

Moths described in 2011
Antequerinae